Tourism in Tokyo is a major industry. In 2006, there were 420 million visits by  Japanese people and 4.81 million visits by foreigners. The economic value of tourist visits to Tokyo totaled ¥9.4 trillion yen. Many tourists visit the various urban districts, stores, and entertainment districts throughout the neighborhoods of the special wards of Tokyo.

Tourist destinations
Japanese schoolchildren on class trips typically visit Tokyo Tower.  
Cultural offerings in Tokyo include both omnipresent Japanese pop culture and associated districts such as Shibuya and Harajuku, subcultural attractions such as Studio Ghibli anime center. Tokyo National Museum  houses over a third of the National Treasures of Japan. No buildings in Tokyo are listed as World Heritage Sites. Among buildings, only the Jizo Hall of Shofuku-ji, a suburban temple, is a National treasure. Other popular attractions include the Imperial Palace, Meiji Shrine, and Sensō-ji, a popular temple.  Many tourists, particularly foreigners, visit Tsukiji Fish Market. Contrary to a common misconception, Tokyo has many green spaces in the city center and  its suburbs.

Transportation
Access to Tokyo is provided by airports including Narita Airport, Tokyo International Airport (Haneda, providing primarily domestic service), and the Shinkansen.  Major hotel districts include Shinjuku and Tokyo Bay, although there are some hotels in many more districts.

Statistics
In 2018, more than 31 million foreign tourists visited Japan, a great increase   from around 6.8 million foreign visitors in 2009.

See other

 Architecture in Tokyo
 Festivals in Tokyo
 List of parks and gardens in Tokyo
 List of museums in Tokyo
 Special wards of Tokyo
 Sports in Tokyo
 Tourism in Japan

References

External links

Official Tokyo Tourism Info